Cohaesibacter marisflavi is a gram-negative, catalase-negative, oxidase-positive rod-shaped bacteria from the genus of Cohaesibacter.

References

External links
Type strain of Cohaesibacter marisflavi at BacDive -  the Bacterial Diversity Metadatabase

Hyphomicrobiales
Bacteria described in 2011